Coot was a steel fishing vessel, built in Scotland in 1892, which became the first Icelandic steam trawler in 1905. After a short but profitable service it was wrecked in Iceland in 1908.

Construction
Coot was built in 1892 at Port Glasgow, then in the county of Renfrewshire, by William Hamilton & Co as Yard No. 87.

The trawler was launched on 9 September 1892, completed the following month, then registered at Port Glasgow with official number 93937.

Fishing service
Coot was built for the Port Glasgow-based fishing fleet of its builder, and registered to the ownership of William and John Hamilton with fishery number PGW39.

Iceland
Prior to the arrival of Coot there had attempts by various foreign-owned companies to run trawling fleets off Iceland but these had not proved commercially successful. An English fisherman from Devon, Mr. Pike Ward, registered the trawler Utopia in Iceland, but it was not a commercial success due to what might be termed "alcohol related human capital problems".

The Coot (GK 310) operated from Hafnarfjörður between 1905 and 1908. It was owned by Icelandic entrepreneurs who founded fishing business Fiskveiðihlutafélag Faxaflóa. It was driven by a steam engine and fished using a trawl.

Loss
On 14 December 1908, Coot sailed on a fishing trip, with another fishing vessel, Kópanes, in tow. In the evening, Kopanes damaged the propeller of Coot and both vessels drifted ashore on Vatnsleysuströnd at Keilisnes, about 5 miles west of Hafnarfjörður, becoming wrecks.

The ship's boiler is preserved in Hafnarfjörður, beside Reykjavíkurvegur, near the junction with Strandgata and Vesturgata.

Commemoration
A painting of Coot was used as a design for a stamp issued in March 2004. The stamp bears the title Fyrsti Togarinn Á Íslandi, Coot 1904 and its value, 50.00.

References 

Trawlers
Fishing in Iceland
Ships built on the River Clyde
1892 ships